Artem Oleksandrovych Hordiyenko (born 4 March 1991) is a Ukrainian professional footballer who plays as a midfielder.

Career
He is a product of the FC Shakhtar Krasnyi Luch and LVUFK Luhansk sportive schools.

Hordiyenko made his debut for main Zorya team in full-time match against Tavriya Simferopol in Ukrainian Premier League on 26 May 2013.

References

External links 
 
 

1991 births
Living people
People from Krasnyi Luch
Ukrainian footballers
Ukraine youth international footballers
Association football midfielders
FC Zorya Luhansk players
FC Sheriff Tiraspol players
FC Oleksandriya players
FC Kryvbas Kryvyi Rih players
Ukrainian Premier League players
Ukrainian First League players
Moldovan Super Liga players
Ukrainian expatriate footballers
Expatriate footballers in Moldova
Ukrainian expatriate sportspeople in Moldova
Sportspeople from Luhansk Oblast